USS Marietta is a name used more than once by the U.S. Navy:

 , was a 5‑gun, 28‑oared row gunboat that participated in the War of 1812
 , was a light draft, single‑turreted, ironclad, screw monitor
 , was a schooner rigged gunboat commissioned 1 September 1897
 , was a net layer launched 27 April 1945.

United States Navy ship names